In criminal justice, particularly in North America, correction, corrections, and correctional, are umbrella terms describing a variety of functions typically carried out by government agencies, and involving the punishment, treatment, and supervision of persons who have been convicted of crimes. These functions commonly include imprisonment, parole, and probation. A typical correctional institution is a prison. A correctional system, also known as a penal system, thus refers to a network of agencies that administer a jurisdiction's prisons, and community-based programs like parole, and probation boards. This system is part of the larger criminal justice system, which additionally includes police, prosecution and courts. Jurisdictions throughout Canada and the US have ministries or departments, respectively, of corrections, correctional services, or similarly-named agencies.

"Corrections" is also the name of a field of academic study concerned with the theories, policies, and programs pertaining to the practice of corrections. Its object of study includes personnel training and management as well as the experiences of those on the other side of the fence — the unwilling subjects of the correctional process. Stohr and colleagues (2008) write that "Earlier scholars were more honest, calling what we now call corrections by the name penology, which means the study of punishment for crime."

Terminology 
The idea of "corrective labor" in Soviet Russia dates back as far as December 1917.
From 1929 the USSR started using the terminology "corrective-labor camps"<ref>
{{cite book
| last1 = Ivanova
| first1 = Galina Mikhailovna
| chapter = Chapter 1: Repression and Punishment
| editor1-last = Raleigh
| editor1-first = Donald J
| title = Labor Camp Socialism: The Gulag sdfghin the Soviet Totalitarian System
| url = https://books.google.com/books?id=BvovCgAAQBAJ
| series = New Russian history
| publisher = Routledge
| date = 2015
| page = 23
| isbn = 9781317466642
| access-date = 2016-05-06
| quote = On November 6, 1929, the Central Executive Committee and Sovnarkom of the USSR amended the 'Basic Principles of Criminal Legislation of the Union of SSR and the Union Republics' adopted in 1924. Article 13 of this document reads, in part: 'Social protection measures of a judicial-correctional nature are ... (b) deprivation of liberty in corrective-labor camps in remote locations of the USSR' [...] This was the first mention in Soviet legislation of the term 'corrective-labor camp' (ispravitel'no-trudovoi lager''': ITL) [...]. [P]roclaimed principles of legality and humanism [...] are demonstrated by a different document - the Corrective-Labor Code of 1924.
}}
</ref>
and "corrective labor colonies".

The terminology change in US academia from "penology" to "corrections" occurred in the 1950s and 1960s which was driven by a new philosophy emphasizing rehabilitation. It was accompanied by concrete changes in some prisons, like giving more privileges to inmates, and attempting to instill a more communal atmosphere. At least nominally, most prisons became "correctional institutions", and guards became "correctional officers". Although the corrections-related terminology continued thereafter in US correctional practice, the philosophical view on offenders' treatment took an opposite turn in the 1980s, when academics labeled the "get tough" program as "The New Penology".

 Community Based Corrections 

Community Based Corrections are sanctions imposed on convicted adults or adjudicated juveniles that occur in a residential or community setting outside of jail or prison. The sanctions are enforced by agencies or courts with legal authority over the adult or juvenile offenders.

Community Based Corrections can focus on both of adults and juveniles, attempting to rehabilitate them back into the community. In contrary to the "tough on crime" mindset which expresses harsh punishment, this community based correctional method seeks to transition offenders back into the community.

 Sentences 

In Canada, until 1972, the Criminal Code legislated that courts could impose a form of whipping on male offenders, to be administered on up to three occasions, but did not limit the number of strokes. Whipping of female offenders was not allowed. The whipping could be inflicted using a strap, cat-o'-nine-tails, or a paddle unless specified by the court. The move to abolish corporal punishment in the Canadian penal system coincided with several reforms and a change from the Reform Institutions label to Corrections or Correctional''.

Intermediate sanctions may include sentences to a halfway house or community service program, home confinement, and electronic monitoring. Additional sanctions may be financial and may include fines, forfeiture, and restitution; these are sometimes applied in combination.

Theories

The use of sanctions, which can be either positive (rewarding) or negative (punishment) is the basis of all criminal theory, along with the main goals of social control, and deterrence of deviant behavior.

Many facilities operating in the United States adhere to particular correctional theories. Although often heavily modified, these theories determine the nature of the facilities' design and security operations. The two primary theories used today are the more traditional Remote Supervision and the more contemporary direct supervision model. In the Remote Supervision Model, officers observe the inmate population from remote positions, e.g., towers or secure desk areas. The Direct Supervision Model positions prison officers within the inmate population, creating a more pronounced presence.

List of Departments of Corrections

United States

Alabama Department of Corrections
Alaska Department of Corrections
Arizona Department of Corrections
Arkansas Department of Correction
California Department of Corrections and Rehabilitation
Colorado Department of Corrections
Connecticut Department of Correction
Delaware Department of Correction
District of Columbia Department of Corrections
Florida Department of Corrections
Georgia Department of Corrections
Guam Department of Corrections
Hawaii Department of Public Safety
Idaho Department of Correction
Illinois Department of Corrections
Indiana Department of Correction
Iowa Department of Corrections
Kansas Department of Corrections
Kentucky Department of Corrections
Louisiana Department of Public Safety & Corrections
Maine Department of Corrections
Maryland Department of Public Safety and Correctional Services
Massachusetts Department of Correction
Michigan Department of Corrections
Minnesota Department of Corrections
Mississippi Department of Corrections
Missouri Department of Corrections
Montana Department of Corrections
Nebraska Department of Correctional Services
Nevada Department of Corrections
New Hampshire Department of Corrections
New Jersey Department of Corrections
New Mexico Corrections Department
New York State Department of Correctional Services
New York City Department of Correction
North Carolina Department of Correction
North Dakota Department of Corrections and Rehabilitation
Ohio Department of Rehabilitation and Correction
Oklahoma Department of Corrections
Oregon Department of Corrections
Pennsylvania Department of Corrections
Puerto Rico Department of Corrections and Rehabilitation
Rhode Island Department of Corrections
South Carolina Department of Corrections
South Dakota Department of Corrections
Tennessee Department of Correction
Texas Department of Criminal Justice (formed from the Texas Department of Corrections)
Utah Department of Corrections
Vermont Department of Corrections
Virginia Department of Corrections
Washington State Department of Corrections
West Virginia Department of Corrections
Wisconsin Department of Corrections
Wyoming Department of Corrections
Federal Bureau of Prisons

Other countries
 Department of Corrections (New Zealand)
 Department of Corrections (Thailand)

See also

American Correctional Association
Death penalty
Deterrence
Individual rights
National Commission on Correctional Health Care
National Institute of Corrections
National Law Enforcement and Corrections Technology Center
National Prison Rape Elimination Commission
Social control
United States Bureau of Justice Statistics

Juvenile corrections
Juvenile court
Juvenile delinquency
Juvenile Justice and Delinquency Prevention Act
Office of Juvenile Justice and Delinquency Prevention

References

Further reading
 
 

Criminal law
Penology